The China Railways JF11 (解放11, Jiěfàng, "liberation") class steam locomotive was a class of 2-8-2 steam locomotives operated by the China Railway.

History

Originally built for the Jinpu Railway and the Zhegan Railway by ALCO and the Baldwin Locomotive Works in the United States in 1918–1937. The Jinpu Railway designated these MK class, received two deliveries, with the first 30 arriving from ALCo between 1918 and 1920. From 1938 to 1945 they were operated by the North China Transportation Company, which grouped them in the Mikana (ミカナ) class. Those that were delivered to the Zhegan Railway were operated by the Central China Railway during the Japanese occupation.

Postwar
They were taken over by China Railways after the end of the Pacific War. China Railways designated them class ㄇㄋ11 (MK11) in 1951, and reclassified them class 解放11 (JF11) in 1959. JF11 3741, 3756, 3767, 3771−3774, 3776, 3777, 3780, 3791, and 3809 are known to have been operated by Liuzhou Railway Bureau after 1959, and the last of the class was retired in 1990.

Preservation
JF11-3773 and JF11-3787  are preserved at Beijing Railway Museum.

References

2-8-2 locomotives
ALCO locomotives
Baldwin locomotives
Railway locomotives introduced in 1918
Steam locomotives of China
Freight locomotives